Hubert de Burgh, Earl of Kent (c. 1170 – before 5 May 1243) was an English nobleman who served as Chief Justiciar of England and Ireland during the reigns of King John and of his son and successor King Henry III and, as a consequence, was one of the most influential and powerful men in English politics in the thirteenth century.

Origins
Hubert de Burgh was born of unknown parents of Burgh-next-Aylsham, Norfolk. A case has been made for Hubert's father being Walter de Burgh, and his mother was named Alice. The family were minor landholders in Norfolk and Suffolk, from whom Hubert inherited at least four manors. His elder brother was William de Burgh (d. 1206), founder of the de Burgh/Burke/Bourke dynasty in Ireland, and his younger brothers were Geoffrey (Archdeacon of Norwich and later Bishop of Ely), and Thomas (castellan of Norwich). Hubert fought alongside King Richard the Lionheart in the Third Crusade. Clarence Ellis noted that there were three versions of Hubert de Burgh's arms: 1 Lozengy gules and vair, 2 Masculy vair and gules, and 3 Gules 7 Mascles 3:3 and 1 vair, with number 2 being the version given in the Grimaldy Roll of circa 1350.

Appointments by King John
Hubert de Burgh had entered the service of Prince John by 1198, and rose in importance in John's administration: he served successively as chamberlain of John's household, Ambassador to Portugal, Sheriff first of Dorset and Somerset (1200–1204) and then of Berkshire (1202–4) and Cornwall (1202), custodian of the castles of Dover, Launceston and Windsor, and then of the Welsh Marches. For these services, he was granted a series of manors, baronies, and other castles, and became a powerful figure in John's administration.

In 1202, de Burgh was sent to France by King John, to assist in the defense of Poitou against King Philip II of France. He was appointed castellan of the great castle of Chinon in Touraine. During this time, he served as guard of the captured Arthur I, Duke of Brittany. After almost all of Poitou had fallen to the French king, de Burgh held the castle for an entire year, until he was captured during the ultimately successful storming of the castle in 1205. He was held captive until 1207, during which time his royal appointments and grants of land passed to other men. Following his return to England, de Burgh did, however, acquire other offices in John's administration. He also acquired lands scattered throughout East Anglia, South-West England, and elsewhere, making him once again an important baron in England.

In 1212, de Burgh returned to France at first as deputy seneschal of Poitou and then as seneschal (1212–1215). He served John in his efforts to recover dominions lost to Philip II of France, until the signing of a truce between John and Philip following John's failed military campaign in France in 1214.

Chief Justiciar of England
Hubert de Burgh remained loyal to King John during the barons' rebellion in the last years of his reign. In the early stages of that rebellion, John sent de Burgh to London with the Bishop of Coventry, in an unsuccessful attempt to command the people of London to resist the Barons' military advance. De Burgh and Philip d'Aubigny brought together the king's troops at Rochester, but then John made peace with the rebels. In Magna Carta (1215) de Burgh is listed as one of those who advised the king to sign, and his brother, Geoffrey (Bishop of Ely), was a witness. Hubert de Burgh is also listed as the person who would act on the king's behalf if the king were out of the country. Soon after the issuing of Magna Carta, de Burgh was officially declared Chief Justiciar of England and Ireland.

During the First Barons' War (1215–17), Hubert de Burgh served John as sheriff of Kent (1216–25) and Surrey (1215–16), as well as castellan of Canterbury and Dover. He successfully defended Dover Castle during a siege that lasted until John died (in October 1216), and the infant King Henry III was crowned. He denied Louis VIII of France possession of the castle later in 1216. On 24 August 1217, a French fleet arrived off the coast of Sandwich in Kent, in order to provide Prince (later King) Louis of France, then ravaging England, with soldiers, siege engines and fresh supplies. Hubert set sail to intercept the French fleet and at the resulting Battle of Sandwich he scattered the French and captured their flagship The Great Ship of Bayonne (commanded by Eustace the Monk, who was promptly executed). When the news reached Louis, he entered into fresh peace negotiations.

Regent to Henry III

When Henry III came of age in 1227 Hubert de Burgh was appointed Governor of Rochester Castle, lord of Montgomery Castle in the Welsh Marches, and created Earl of Kent. He remained one of the most influential people at court. On 27 April 1228, he was named Justiciar for life. He was appointed Justiciar of Ireland on 16 June 1232 but never visited Ireland and he retired from this post in August 1232.

However, in 1232, his enemies' plots finally succeeded and he was removed from office and was soon imprisoned at Devizes Castle. When Richard Marshal, 3rd Earl of Pembroke rebelled against the king in 1233, the men holding Hubert de Burgh captive released him and he subsequently joined the rebellion. In 1234, Edmund Rich, Archbishop of Canterbury, effected a reconciliation. Hubert officially resigned the Justiciarship (about 28 May 1234) and no longer exercised the power of the office after September 1232. This judgment was reversed by William de Raley (alias Raleigh) in 1234, which, for a time, restored the earldom.

Trouble with the king
The marriage of Hubert de Burgh's daughter, Margaret (or Megotta as she was also known), to the young Richard of Clare, Earl of Gloucester, brought de Burgh into some trouble in 1236, for the earl was still a minor and in the king's wardship, and the marriage had been celebrated without the royal licence. Hubert, however, protested that the match was not of his making, and promised to pay the king some money, so the matter passed by for the time. Eventually the marriage came to an end, by way of her death.

Lands acquired

In 1206, he purchased the manor of Tunstall in Kent (from Robert de Arsic) which was later inherited by his eldest son, John de Burgh.

Hubert was appointed Constable of Dover Castle and was also given charge of Falaise, in Normandy. At Falaise he was the gaoler of Arthur I, Duke of Brittany, the nephew of King John and boy claimant to the English throne. Arthur may or may not have been murdered after leaving de Burgh's custody; his fate is unknown.

At some time before 1215, Hubert de Burgh is cited as having been appointed Lord Warden of the Cinque Ports (1215–20), which position later (after the Barons' War) included the ex officio constableship of Dover Castle. In the case of de Burgh, however, a rather long period seems to have elapsed between the two appointments.

Sometime after 1215, De Burgh started building a castle in Hadleigh having been awarded the lands by King John. A licence to crenellate was retrospectively given in 1230, at which point that original castle had been completed. After falling out with King Henry III, De Burgh was stripped of Hadleigh Castle. The castle was claimed by the monarchy and stayed in royal hands until being sold (with much of the stonework dismantled and sold) in 1551. The castle later suffered from several landslips, and the ruins are currently owned by English Heritage.

Marriages
Hubert was initially betrothed to Joan de Redvers (daughter of William de Redvers, 5th Earl of Devon), but the marriage never took place and she later married William Brewer II (d. 1232), eldest surviving son and heir of William Brewer (d. 1226), who was a prominent administrator and judge during the reigns of Richard I, John and Henry III.

Hubert de Burgh married three times:
 Firstly, Beatrice (daughter of William de Warrenne) with whom he had two sons: Sir John (whose descendant, Margaret, married Richard Óg de Burgh, 2nd Earl of Ulster) and Sir Hubert (ancestor of Thomas Burgh of Gainsborough).
 Secondly (September 1217), Isabella, Countess of Gloucester (daughter and heiress of William FitzRobert, 2nd Earl of Gloucester).
 Thirdly, Princess Margaret (sister of King Alexander II of Scotland) with whom he had a daughter, Margaret, who married Richard de Clare, 6th Earl of Gloucester.

Death 
Hubert de Burgh died in Banstead, Surrey, in 1243, and was buried in the Church of the Friars Preachers (commonly called Black Friars) in Holborn, London.

His sons did not inherit his earldom, as the inheritance of the earldom was restricted to descendants of Hubert and his third wife, possibly because Henry III granted the title on account of Hubert marrying a Scottish princess.

Fictional portrayals
Hubert is a character in Shakespeare's play King John. On screen, he has been portrayed by Franklyn McLeay in the silent short King John (1899), which recreates John's death scene; by Jonathan Adams in the BBC TV drama series The Devil's Crown (1978); and by John Thaw in the BBC Shakespeare version of The Life and Death of King John (1984). The story of his daughter's marriage is told in Edith Pargeter's novel The Marriage of Meggotta (1979).

See also
House of Burgh – an Anglo-Norman and Hiberno-Norman dynasty founded in 1193

References

Bibliography

Further reading

 
 Harwood, Brian, Fixer & Fighter The Life of Hubert de Burgh, Earl of Kent, 1170–1243. Pen & Sword (2016)
 
 
 
 West, F. J. The Justiciarship in England 1066–1232'' (Cambridge, 1966)

1170s births
1243 deaths
12th-century English people
13th-century English nobility
13th-century viceregal rulers
Anglo-Normans
Earls of Kent
High Sheriffs of Berkshire
High Sheriffs of Dorset
High Sheriffs of Somerset
High Sheriffs of Herefordshire
High Sheriffs of Lincolnshire
High Sheriffs of Kent
High Sheriffs of Surrey
High Sheriffs of Norfolk
High Sheriffs of Suffolk
Justiciars of England
Lords Warden of the Cinque Ports
Regents of England
Prisoners in the Tower of London
Hubert
People of the Barons' Wars
Burials at the Church of the Black Friars, London
Hubert de Burgh, Earl of Kent
Lords Lieutenant of Ireland